The Kawasaki Z1300 is a standard motorcycle unusual for its large-displacement 1,300 cc straight-six engine made by Kawasaki from 1979 to 1989.

Performance
Kawasaki Z1300's length is 89.1 inches, and its width is 30.9 inches, its height: 49.8 inches, the wheelbase is 62.2 inches, seat height is 31.2 inches, ground clearance is 5.5 inches, weight is 314 kg.

The Z1300 had six cylinders, water cooling, and shaft drive. During its ten-year production run, fuelling was switched from carburetors to electronic fuel injection and suspension was upgraded to air systems front and rear. Fuel injection system was adopted primarily to improve fuel consumption, but as a bonus were increased power and torque.

However, no other EU country followed suit, and France is set to abolish the 100 bhp limit in 2016.

Series 
The Kawasaki Z1300 was manufactured in several versions, namely: Z1300, KZ1300, ZG1300 and ZN1300. It is the biggest model of the still-ongoing Z series that was started in 1972 with the Z1 (900). In the U.S., the model was equipped with a windshield, suitcase, and a redesigned frame. This new model was called "Voyager". In Europe, the traditional model was still available. The last 200 models (built in America as all Z1300 models were), built in 1989, have been called "Legendary Six", and were equipped with a special logo on the fuel tank to show that to the public. After a ten-year production run, Kawasaki's only liquid-cooled six-cylinder engine motorcycle was discontinued in 1989 after 20,000 KZ1300/Z1300 models and 4,500 Voyager models had been produced.

History

Brand History 
Kawasaki Motorcycle's history began in the 1966. Kawasaki Motorcycle is a motorcycle produced by Kawasaki Heavy Industries' Motorcycle and Engine Division. Its first headquarters was located in an old meat warehouse, and started humble in the United States. Their initial focus was to realize their dreams and therefore did not focus on any fancy things to minimize management costs and use their finances for bicycle production. Three years after being listed in the United States, Kawasaki Motorcycle Company produced the Mach III 500cc two-stroke three-cylinder engine in 1969. This was a major turning point for Kawasaki Motorcycle Company. This invention changed the rules of the game in the industry in terms of performance and successfully won the international market. Nowadays, it is a world-renowned motorcycle brand with factories in Japan, Michigan, Philippines, India, Indonesia, Bangladesh, and Thailand.

Headquarters history 

Kawasaki Heavy Industries, is a Japanese company with heavy industry as its primary business. Its business scope covers aviation, space, railway vehicles, motorcycles, ships, machinery, and various equipment. Has occupies a pivotal position in motorcycle brands and is also one of the four powerful motorcycles in Japan.

Sbarro Super Twelve
In 1982, Swiss specialty car manufacturer Sbarro constructed a mid-engined sports car with hatchback bodywork called the Sbarro Super Twelve. The Super Twelve had an inline twelve-cylinder engine (a nominal straight-12) which consisted of two "joined" Z1300 engines. The two engines were not a unit, as such, they were connected only by belt. Each engine kept its own gearbox and drove its own rear wheel. Performance was described as "ferocious". Only one was ever built.

Millyard Z2300 V-12
In 2008, noted British engineer and motorcycle customizer Allen Millyard built a one-off 2300 cc version of the Z1300 by joining two Z1300 engines together in a V-12 configuration. Although Z1300 weight is more than 300 kg, this powerful heart takes less than 12 seconds to accelerate from 0 to 400 meters, and the top speed can reach 220 km/h. Together with the Honda CBX, Suzuki GS1000 and Yamaha XS1100 in the same period, it is described as a "superbike." for their extreme size and performance for the time.

Malpractice and maintenance method 
Maintenance of the Z1300s is relatively easy. Due to the upgrade of the ignition system, Therefore, the valve clearance needs to be checked regularly, but it is rarely necessary to change the gasket before 10,000 miles. The carburettor on these machines requires regular balance checks to ensure fuel economy and performance. 

Because the Z1300 has transformed into a 6-cylinder engine across the ages. 6-cylinder machines are unmatched by the increase in speed and diversification of design, more robust power, and smoother vibration. But things have two sides. Once a failure occurs, multi-cylinders are more troublesome than single-cylinders, so maintenance is more troublesome and difficult. Although the six-cylinder engine of the Z1300 is excellent, the eagerness for the whole bike leads to a heavy riding experience and high fuel consumption. Although its straight-six engine was smooth, the motorcycle was heavy, expensive and not fuel efficient, and the Z1300 sold poorly, particularly in Europe. The emergence of multi-cylinders is an improvement and evolution due to the limited output power of a single cylinder. Rather than judging which is better and worse, it is better to regard it as a need for competition among various manufacturers. Kawasaki experienced some oil system problems on the early Z1300 (on the A2 engine number KZT30A-006201, the oil pan volume increased from 4.5 to 6 litres).

See also 
 Kawasaki Z series

References

Z1300
Six-cylinder motorcycles
Touring motorcycles
Shaft drive motorcycles
Motorcycles introduced in 1979